Biggleswade Town Football Club is a football club based in Biggleswade, Bedfordshire, England.

History
The club were established in 1874 as Biggleswade, later becoming known as Biggleswade & District, and played only friendlies and cup matches until the late 1890s. In 1902 they were founder members of the Biggleswade and District League, and were its first champions, also winning the Bedfordshire Senior Cup that year. The club went on to win the league twice more before World War I, also playing in the Bedford & District League between 1909 and 1912 and winning one title.

In 1920 Biggleswade Town joined the Northamptonshire League, which became the United Counties League in 1934, and won the Bedfordshire Premier Cup in 1922–23 and 1927–28. After World War II the club adopted its current name and joined the Spartan League in 1945. They returned to the UCL in 1951, before switching to the Eastern Counties League in 1955. During their time in the ECL they set the record for biggest away win with a 12–0 victory over Newmarket Town. In 1963 they returned to the UCL due to the increasing transport costs. The 1975–76 season saw them finish bottom of the Premier Division, resulting in relegation to Division One. In 1980 they joined the Premier Division of the South Midlands League. They were relegated to Division One in 1983, but were promoted back to the Premier Division in 1987. When the Spartan and South Midlands leagues merged to form the Spartan South Midlands League in 1997 the club were placed in the Premier Division North. The following season they were placed in the Senior Division, and after finishing fifth, were promoted to the Premier Division.

In 2007–08 Biggleswade Town won the Bedfordshire Premier Cup for a third time, beating Luton Town 3–2 in the final. The following season they won the league title, earning promotion to Division One Midlands of the Southern League. In 2010 the division was renamed Division One Central, and the 2010–11 season saw Biggleswade finish fourth, qualifying for the promotion play-offs and losing 2–0 to Daventry Town in the semi-finals. In 2012–13 they finished fourth again, and in the subsequently play-offs they beat Godalming Town 2–1 in the semi-finals and Rugby Town 3–1 to earn promotion to the Premier Division. In 2014–15 the club reached the first round of the FA Cup for the first time, losing 4–1 at Stourbridge.

Season-by-season record

Ground

The club originally played at the Fairfield Road ground, which was shared with a local cricket club. A wooden stand was erected in the 1920s, and for several years had an Anderson shelter on either side. Floodlights were installed in 1989, and the wooden stand was demolished after being condemned in the 1990s. In 2006 the club left Fairfield Road and groundshared with Bedford United & Valerio whilst a new ground was built on Langford Road.

The new ground, named the Carlsberg Stadium for sponsorship purposes, was opened for the start of the 2008–09 season, with the first game on 13 August 2008 between Biggleswade Town and Hertford Town resulting in a 1–0 for the home team. The ground has a capacity of 3,000, of which 300 is seated.

Current squad
 

The Southern Football League does not use a squad numbering system.

Management and coaching staff

Boardroom

Current staff

Managerial history

Honours
United Counties League
Premier Division Cup winners 1973–74
Division One cup winners 1963–64, 1979–80
Division One Cup winners 1979–80
South Midlands League
Premier Division Cup winners 1991–92
League Challenge Trophy winners 1992–93
Floodlit Cup winners 1995–96, 2002–03
Spartan South Midlands League
Premier Division champions 2008–09
Biggleswade & District League
Champions 1902–03
Bedfordshire Premier Cup
Winners 1922–23, 1927–28, 2007–08
Bedfordshire Senior Cup
Winners 1902–03, 1907–08, 1946–47, 1950–51, 1961–62, 1962–63, 1966–67, 1973–74, 2018–19
Huntingdonshire Premier Cup
Winners 1992–93, 1993–94, 1997–98, 2000–01, 2002–03

Records
Best FA Cup performance: First round, 2013–14
Best FA Trophy performance: Second qualifying round, 1974–75, 2014–15
Best FA Vase performance: Quarter-finals, 2008–09

See also
Biggleswade Town F.C. players

References

External links
Official website

Football clubs in England
Football clubs in Bedfordshire
Association football clubs established in 1874
1874 establishments in England
Biggleswade
United Counties League
Spartan League
Eastern Counties Football League
South Midlands League
Spartan South Midlands Football League
Southern Football League clubs